Barnett House, also known as Big Spring, is a historic home located near Elliston, Montgomery County, Virginia.  The house was built about 1808, and underwent a radical transformation in the early 20th century.  It is a two-story, five bay brick dwelling with a single pile central passage plan.  The front facade features a one-story wraparound porch through the two-story portico across the facade.  Also on the property is a contributing stuccoed frame meathouse.

It was listed on the National Register of Historic Places in 1989.

References

Houses on the National Register of Historic Places in Virginia
Houses completed in 1808
Houses in Montgomery County, Virginia
National Register of Historic Places in Montgomery County, Virginia
Elliston, Virginia